The Boulevard House, now the Southwest Detroit Community House, is located in Southwest Detroit, Michigan and situated right on the Boulevard, in the articulation of Mexicantown, Mexican Village, and Hubbard Farms.  It is the University of Michigan's settlement house, providing space for praxis among community scholars, community activists and residents. Since it was established in mid-2012, the Boulevard House has been used to create a place-based space to develop projects, engage community and support social change.

History of the Settlement House Movement

The Boulevard House reflects the traditions and approach of the settlement house model in U.S. social work. Inspired by England's Toynbee Hall, the approach was adopted in the United States in the late 1880s and 1890s with such organizations as Stanton Coit's Neighborhood Guild (New York's Lower East Side), Lillian Wald's Henry Street Settlement (Manhattan) and Jane Addams' Hull House (Chicago).  The term "settlement house" mirrored a belief that community outreach should be done from within a community, and the houses provided a residential and community space for those working on local social issues.  Original settlement houses often taught adult education and English language classes, provided schooling for immigrants' children, organized job clubs, offered after-school recreation, initiated public health services, and advocated for improved housing for the poor and working classes. In most modern iterations, settlement houses evolved into community centers and no longer provide residential housing for its workers.  United Neighborhood Centers for America is the current settlement house membership organization and estimates there are 150 active settlement houses in the U.S.

Purpose 

The Boulevard House works for the needs and benefits of the neighborhood and larger community, using the models of community-based participatory research and empowerment evaluation. Using these models, the Boulevard House is a space for observation and discussion, creating opportunities for community engagement, action and change initiatives. It is based in community-embedded praxis, which identifies five aspects of social change needed to produce positive and sustainable effects on the social, political and economic systems. Those aspects include comprehensiveness, synchrony, integration, long-term perspective, and inclusiveness.

In addition to the above, the Boulevard House adheres to certain practice principles and integrates ongoing community feedback and discovery. The principles of practice are as follows:

 Recognize community as a unity of identity
 Build on strengths and resources within the community
 Facilitate collaborative, equitable involvement of all partners in all phases of the research and practice
 Integrate knowledge and intervention for mutual benefit of all partners
 Promote a co-learned and empowering process that attends to social inequalities
 Involve a cyclical and iterative process
 Disseminate findings and knowledge gained to all partners
 Involve long-term commitment by all partners

Call to Action 

Between 2008 and 2011, the economic downfall of Detroit affected community service programs. Detroit is increasingly recognized among critical social policy theorists as one of the first industrialized, Western democracy cities dramatically emerging from a post‐industrial to "neostructural" society. In Detroit, new forms of governance are emerging through a local experience of painful abrogation of democratically elected municipal leadership. Population declines resulted in fewer federal and state resources supporting the traditional range of community services; for example, Detroit's Department of Public Health and City of Detroit Human Services closed, with services eliminated or outsourced to the private sector. Only a few programs survive and thrive through mergers, and many more community programs dramatically reduced services, merged or are in the process of closing.

In response, a group of residents, university faculty and social workers began looking at other Detroit neighborhoods which were successfully working to maintain quality of life. As a result, the collaboration applied their knowledge of the settlement house ideal and potential for community work, creating a settlement house reflective of the 21st century.

This creative opportunity fit well with the engagement interests of CBI Scholars. The Community-Based Initiative (CBI) is a fellowship program at the University of Michigan's School of Social Work, begun in 1999. It works to create and sustain community and social change in urban cities, neighborhoods and communities, with a specific focus on Detroit.

The Boulevard House was launched in summer of 2012 with a vision of providing project-based learning and engagement with the surrounding community. Invited to settle in the vacant property owned by People's Community Services, the project was funded by the UM School of Social Work.  The concept developed with a project team at University of Michigan (UM) and a core community committee. The initial stakeholders included: Larry Gant (UM-Social Work and Art & Design), Maria Cotera (UM-Latina/o Studies), Tom Cervenak (People’s Community Services), Mike Garcia (UAW), Mary Luevanos (CLAVE), Lisa Luevanos (CLAVE), Diana Rivera (Michigan State University) and Gloria Rocha (Comite Patriotico Mexicano).

Boulevard House is a call to action to the community, CBI scholars, and all community allies to engage in creative, positive, self-determined change from the ground, up.

Programs

2012-2014

One of the strong initial project partners, El Museo del Norte, opened the exhibit, We Will Be Heard!, at the Boulevard House in 2013. This was followed in 2014 by the current exhibit, Las Rebeldes. Preparation for these exhibits involved partners at the University of Michigan and in the community, and they collaboratively completed a lion's share of renovation work inside the house. El Museo has been a primary presence and mobilization force at the Boulevard House for the first year, and drew support from Maria Cotera, Elena Herrada (Fronteras Norteñas), Jennifer Peacock (UM-Program in American Culture) and Mick Kennedy (UM-School of Architecture).

The Stamps School of Art & Design (SSA&D) also initiated an art exhibit in spring of 2014, Una Vida Linda by Rolando Palacio, which required additional, continued UM and community partner support in preparing the space.

Over the summer of 2014, Nick Tobier (Stamps) and Larry Gant (SSW/SSA&D) used funding through MCubed to host a Detroit-native artist-in-residence, Alana Hoey.

In 2014, University of Michigan held several Detroit-based courses at the Boulevard House, including locating the SSW Community-Based Initiative program classwork on site. SSA&D and the School of Music, Theater and Dance (SMTD) also held classes on site.

Current
After some assessment and evaluation throughout Fall 2014, the direction of the Boulevard House emerged as one which explores a major social theme specific to Southwest Detroit: the theme of contested proverbial and literal ground in a highly heterogeneous community with a number of waves of immigration, strong enclave identities, and immense development pressures associated with large-scale projects, such as highway construction and land use for a new transborder bridge.

As part of its praxis, the Boulevard House chose to engage this theme through a number of theoretical and practice models in order to engage different individuals in relevant ways. A great emphasis has been placed on art as a tool of expression, because it allows participants to express the deepest and most fundamental elements of human experience. Boulevard House's programming has been carefully crafted to occupy a niche not currently filled and which appears to be relevant within the community.

Current 2015 events include a weekly open discussion group which focuses on Detroit social issues and politics, Kaffe Politik; a quarterly event which features a themed exhibit, music and a panel, Salon Saturday; a monthly event which features a critical film on social policy, Social Cinema; ad hoc scheduling for planning Hubbard Farms events, neighborhood watch meetings, or other community-driven organizing and education; and weekly University of Michigan Social Work classes for the CBI program.

Critical Exploration of Project Challenges
The Boulevard House has experienced a number of challenges that continue to be integrated and addressed.  For the first two years, the Museo del Norte project was the strongest presence in the space.  El Museo featured exhibits with publicized openings and received strong community support; however, lack of consistent access to the exhibits and infrequent events compromised the space as a destination or community presence.  Because el Museo was Boulevard's House primary user, it was unclear that the Boulevard House had its own mission and goals which were distinct from any one project under its roof.

However, the Boulevard House's larger mission and goals remained largely in planning stages, due to lack of staff and funding.  In Fall 2014, elements finally combined to allow a more directed presence and programming.  A project plan was created which prioritized completing initial remodeling work inside the space to optimize areas for galleries; office space to support community scholars in their applied research; and overnight residential space for graduate students, faculty, activists, and allies who were engaged in Detroit.  This first project stage was impacted by tensions around ownership and control of the space among partners and the landlord.  As this was being resolved, the renovation stage was terminated entirely, following the landlord's notice that the building was being put on the market.

With UM's long-term occupancy now in question, the program team regrouped and moved forward immediately with implementing the second stage of the project plan - creating programming within the space.  The new circumstances raised interesting questions about how to create place-based space when the "place" was uncertain.  While creating logistical ambiguities which must be managed, the situation mirrored critical questions about changes taking place within Detroit:  What does it mean to occupy space which is tenuous as an indirect result of economic politics?  Who has claim to the city and how is that expressed through land policies?  In looking at occupancy, what does it mean to be authentic and legitimate, and whose voices govern the determination?  If Boulevard House must relocate, does it relocate to another Southwest location or elsewhere in the city - and what questions does that raise about the service constituency of Boulevard House or effective strategies around being a transformative partner?

Applied scholars affiliated with the Boulevard House actively engage with these questions and others as they move forward with programming and project development.

Applied Theories, Frameworks and Models 

Settlement houses are an approach to social work defined by praxis: praxis can be thought of as applied scholarship, where theories and frameworks are integrated into action. In turn, the action informs and refines the theories and approaches. Paulo Freire defines praxis in Pedagogy of the Oppressed as "reflection and action directed at the structures to be transformed." Through praxis, people can acquire a critical awareness of their own condition and, with their allies, work for social transformation.

The Boulevard House embodies all general settlement house principles and is intended to provide a praxis space for theories, models, frameworks and approaches within community organizing. The underlying theory to be applied depends largely on the project and practitioner or engaged group. Several examples are discussed below.

Empowerment Theory 
 Empowerment theory asserts that goals are achieved by building on individual and community strengths and resources. Practitioners and activists identify personal and political barriers that maintain oppression and discrimination; increase personal and community power through education, advocacy and direct action; and acknowledge that power is contextual when applying tactics. A settlement house supports this approach by providing space, support and programs aimed at these goals; in particular, the Boulevard House applies this model by providing free space and technical support to any community group which is organizing a project.

Ecological Theory 
Ecological theory is a systems theory which states that environmental systems impact individuals and individuals also have the power to impact their environments.  The theory identifies and analyzes five dynamic environmental systems:

 Micro system: Roles and relationships that a person has in their immediate environment
 Mezzo system: Interactions among two or more micro system environments.
 Exosystem: All of the external social settings that affect an individual's micro system
 Macrosystem: Cultural and social factors
 Chronosystem: Patterns of change over time

A settlement house provides systems consciousness-raising opportunities and provides space, support and programs through which interventions can be created and implemented, thus changing system dynamics for positive effect within the community.  The Boulevard House exemplifies this theory through the Kaffe Politik event, during which community members are encouraged to think critically and systemically about local politics and social policy.

Strengths Perspective 
Similar to empowerment theory, the strengths perspective recognizes the assets, capacities, talents, skills, resiliency, hopes and self-determination that individuals and communities possess and embody. Through this perspective, settlement houses create activities and programs which support individuals and families, while communities are encouraged to develop interventions and participate in a group process. The Boulevard House applies this model by providing technical support to any self-organizing community group to help clarify their assets and assist in network building which addresses remaining opportunities.

Feminist Theory 
Feminist theory critically examines "sexism, sexist exploitation and oppression," according to bell hooks.  Feminist theory advocates engaging in dialogue around gender, race, class, ethnicity, sexuality, nationality, age and religion, bringing women's experience to the forefront of pedagogy and thought. One of the basic tenets in feminist activism is making the personal political. By creating a residential space through which practitioners can immerse in the community and engage for a sustained duration, settlement houses embody the overlay of personal, political and meaningful work spaces, contributing significantly to practitioners' own consciousness development.  Additionally, programming at settlement houses provide space, support and programs aimed at feminist consciousness raising goals.  More, by including residential space at Boulevard House and "opening the home" to the community for all activities, this approach is embodied.

Women-Centered Model 
The women-centered model shares a root idea with Feminist theory in understanding that the personal is political.  In case studies cited by Smock, the women-centered model focuses on programs which first strengthen women's self-sufficiency in their personal lives so that they can build skills and confidence which is then applied in the larger community.  Settlement houses often model the women-centered model through the many women activists who are working through the center, and therefore provide excellent networking and mentoring opportunities for all women in the community.  The Boulevard House offers periodic skills building workshops which would reflect this approach.

Civic Model 
The civic model identifies activists within the community as those who are "natural" leaders, and who begin to participate in the community through their own initiative, often applying skills which they've acquired in the workforce or other activities.  In some ways, this is an extension of a strengths perspective, since it leverages existing abilities and resources within the community for tasks and goals.  It is often a utilitarian approach, focusing more on specific concerns and reform than sweeping change.  It is often seen at the level of neighborhood associations which seek to restore neighborhood stability by inviting neighbors to meet, interact, and problem solve in informal settings.  The Boulevard House is situated in a neighborhood which uses the civic model for its organization, providing space for work and planning groups, as requested.

Community Building Model 
The community building model focuses on mobilizing community members through collectives, organizations and agencies.  Rather than focusing on individuals, per se, this approach focuses on combined power and influence through more formal structure and governance.  This approach holds that collective organizations have greater ability to counter and negotiate with government or powerful private interests.  Although the Boulevard House chooses to minimize this approach in favor of grass-roots organizing, its association with the University of Michigan and ability to leverage certain resources which are external to any one community places it within this model.

Transformative Model 
The transformative model, as defined by Smock, is concerned with formation of extra-local networks, based on shared ideology and concerns. The model, by this definition, seeks to help local activists connect direct experience with large social systems by emphasizing critical thinking and education in theory.  The settlement house model provides a literal space for these connections to take place, as well as a place where social issues and their themes can be deconstructed in a group forum. The emphasis in this approach is ultimately to challenge and change structural causes. Pyles uses "transformative" in a different way, citing the philosophies of practitioners like Paulo Freire. Freire asserts that community members have "ownership of the social meaning that will form the basis for social change" and "a single isolated individual is never conscientized alone, but as part of a community whereby solidarity is developed in relation to a common situation."  The focus is on process rather than ends, and it is both revolutionary and ideological in nature. As a community space wherein groups come together to learn, plan, organize and act as agents in the community, settlement houses exemplify this understanding of transformative work. The Boulevard House, in particular, has staff working on a Resident Community Activist concept for Fall 2015; this would draw from the transformative models cited by both Smock and Pyles by selecting an organic activist within the community and providing residential support with academic training in theory in order to deepen his/her local practice.

Marxism 
Marxism is relevant to community organizing because it critiques structural barriers within society which ensure hierarchical status quo.  In particular, Marxism is concerned with who owns the creative process, whether that process is manufacturing or ensuring safe neighborhoods.  While often thought of as a political economic theory, it has clear applications to all sociopolitical concerns. All programming at the Boulevard House is direct and participatory, ensuring that community members own both the process and the product of their collaboration and efforts.

Anarchy 
Anarchy, contrary to popular characterizations as chaotic and violent, is a participatory democracy framework in which order is derived from reciprocal aid and resources.  While not opposed to State organization, anarchy holds that this must never be coercive or oppressive, and all authority is accountable to those whom it serves.  As a de facto community center, the settlement house model and the Boulevard House, in particular, exemplify the anarchist ideal of participatory democracy which focuses on voluntary alliances within the community for social care.  In particular, any organizing in which practitioners are involved must provide adequate notice for optimal inclusion of the community and provide clear updates and status reports to the public, for transparency and accountability.

References

External links
 Boulevard House Website
 Boulevard House Facebook Page

Organizations based in Detroit